The Faculty of Industrial Design at TU Delft (abbr. IO) was established in 1969 and was originally named "Industrial Formgiving".

History
The first academic education programmes for industrial designers were at the TU Delft Faculty of Architecture. This faculty trained not only architects, but also designers of furniture and everyday utensils. The first students of the 'Technical and Industrial Design' programme started their education with a foundation course in Architecture. In 1969, an independent programme in 'Technical Industrial Design' was established with its own engineering degree. In addition to design, technical subjects played a major role. Ergonomics were also incorporated immediately and furthermore, market research was carried out. Finally, the management side was included in the programme. In 1981, the engineering degree and the interim department was renamed Industrial Design. When the Technical Polytechnic became the Delft University of Technology in 1986, Industrial Design finally became the Faculty of Industrial Design.

See also 

 WikID

External links 

 TU Delft – Faculty of Industrial Design website

Industrial design